Stirling is a town in the Adelaide Hills, South Australia, approximately 15 km from the Adelaide city centre. It is administered by the Adelaide Hills Council. Neighbouring townships are Crafers and Aldgate. Other nearby towns are Heathfield and Bridgewater. Of those five, Stirling has by far the largest commercial strip, with the greatest number and widest variety of shops, and the only banks.
Stirling East, a similar sized area towards Aldgate, is home to several schools.

History
Stirling is named after Edward Stirling. He was the illegitimate son of Archibald Stirling, a planter in the British West Indies, and a Creole woman. He was able to travel to South Australia because of a financial gift from his father who had been freshly compensated for his slaves on the emancipation of the British West Indies.

Founded in 1854, Stirling grew rapidly as a result of the expansion of apple growing and market gardening to satisfy the demand of the expanding city of Adelaide, whose centre is only 15 kilometres from Stirling. It also developed as a residential address for English migrants who could afford it, to escape Adelaide's hot summers, often 10 degrees cooler than Adelaide. As a result, many historic, grand mansions can be found in the area. Today, farming has declined as more of the region has been urbanised, with many Stirling residents commuting to Adelaide daily.

Vegetation 
Many deciduous trees, particularly the maple, elm, oak and ash trees, have been imported from Europe and North America. These trees flourish in Stirling's wet and mild to cool climate and are a popular tourist attraction in the autumn months (April–May), bringing rich and vibrant autumn leaf colour to the town. This activity is known as "leaf peeping". Some Australian cities are too warm (even in the autumn and winter months) to accommodate and produce maple trees, but some temperate regions along the eastern coast and towns at higher altitudes flourish in colour during autumn, rivalling those in North America, Europe and Japan.

Other tourist sites include the nearby Mount Lofty Botanic Garden and Cleland National Park.

Climate

Stirling has a warm-summer Mediterranean climate (Köppen climate classification: Csb). Owing to its location near Mount Lofty, Stirling is the wettest place in South Australia, receiving an average of 1,107 millimetres (43.6 inches) of rain per year—more than twice the average of Adelaide. Between May and August, the average monthly rainfall is as high as 155 millimetres (over 6 inches), and in June 1916, over 450 millimetres fell. Mean summer temperatures are about 5 °C (9 °F) lower than in Adelaide, which may explain why Stirling was recommended as a desirable residence for English migrants and Adelaide's high society in the 20th century. Winters are distinctly cool particularly compared to Adelaide, with an average minimum of 4 °C (39 °F) and an average maximum of 11 °C (52 °F).

The Australian Bureau of Meteorology stopped the collection of weather data at Stirling from the 1980s onward.  Weather recording instruments were removed from the grounds of Australia Post's Stirling office following a commercial dispute between these two Australian government organisations.

Government
Stirling is located in the state electorate of Heysen and in the federal Division of Mayo. The local council is the Adelaide Hills Council (formerly Stirling Council) in the Mt Lofty and Manoah wards.

Culture
A prominent landmark in Stirling is the historical Stirling Theatre, home to the Hills Musical Company, Stirling Players and Hills Youth Theatre. Stirling also has a strong affinity with books and has been referred to as South Australia's 'Book Village'. This relates to the close proximity of varied book venues Chapter Two Books, Matilda Bookshop, The Hut Book Shed and the Coventry Memorial Library.

Artistic Community 
Stirling has traditionally had a strong community of artists. Notable are abstract artist, Colin Russell Gardiner who was a former electrician and held many exhibitions in the 1970s and 1980s.
Michael Plant Atchison OAM (4 August 1933 – 16 February 2009) was an Australian cartoonist who worked for the South Australian Advertiser for over 40 years.

Fire Service
The Stirling community is protected from fire, road crash and hazardous materials by the Stirling Country Fire Service Volunteers.
In 2006, the Adelaide Hills Council stepped up efforts to relocate the station to Crafers, against the wants of the volunteers. The council proposed the move in order to sell the land currently inhabited by the CFS station on Avenue Road, to fund a new library.  However, in mid-2006 the council elected to sell the land the fire station was on to SAFECOM (South Australian Fire and Emergency Services Commission), which owns all Fire Service assets.  The new library started construction anyway in early 2007, and it was completed the following year.

Transport 
Stirling (Main Street) is very well serviced by public transport, with a 30min off-peak service to the city and nearby Mount Barker (routes  and ). Route  operates nights and weekends only. For the east of Stirling, route  operates to and from the city and route  operates to Crafers. Route  also links Stirling to Carey Gully. For the West of Stirling (heading out towards Heathfield) routes  and  operate via Avenue Road and Longwood Road, at peak times only with very limited interpeak services.

References

Stirling, South Australia